Me gusta, pero me asusta is a Mexican comedy film directed by Beto Gómez. It is a production of Telefilms Group and the production company created by Minnie West and Alejandro Speitzer known as Wetzer Films. The film deals with the life of a young man named Brayan Rodríguez, who has an obligation to expand his family's business in Mexico City. It stars Minnie West and Alejandro Speitzer.

A sequel, Me encanta pero me espanta was released in 2021.

Cast 
 Minnie West as Claudia
 Alejandro Speitzer as Brayan Rodríguez
 Joaquín Cosío as Don Gumaro
 Silverio Palacios as Martín Menchaca
 Héctor Kotsifaks as Norris Zazueta
 Lisette Morelos as Martina

References

External links 
 

2017 comedy films
2017 drama films
Films scored by Mark Mothersbaugh